Pasiphilodes hypodela is a moth in the family Geometridae. It is endemic to New Guinea.

References

External links

Moths described in 1926
Arthropods of New Guinea
Eupitheciini
Endemic fauna of New Guinea